Felicitas Zürcher (born 1973) is a woman Swiss playwright.

Life 
Zürcher studied Germanistic, philosophy and social and economic history at the University of Zurich and the Humboldt University Berlin. In Zurich, she was assistant director at the Theater am Neumarkt and, after her studies, a consultant at a PR agency. From 2001 to 2003 she was assistant director at Maxim Gorki Theater in Berlin and in 2004 she became dramaturge for drama and dance at the Stadttheater Bern. From 2004 to 2009 she was dramaturg at the Deutsches Theater Berlin under  and Oliver Reese. From 2009 to 2016 she worked at the Staatsschauspiel Dresden under artistic director Wilfried Schulz and was also head of the Dresden Acting Studio at the University of Music and Theatre Leipzig from 2011 to 2016. Since 2016, she has held a teaching position at the Folkwang University of the Arts.

For the 2016/17 season, Zürcher moved to the Düsseldorfer Schauspielhaus as head dramaturg. From the 2021/2022 season, she will be head dramaturge at the Bern Theatre.

References

External links 
 
 
 Felicitas Zürcher am Düsseldorfer Schauspielhaus

1973 births
Living people
21st-century dramatists and playwrights
21st-century Swiss writers
21st-century Swiss women writers
Dramaturges
Humboldt University of Berlin alumni
Place of birth missing (living people)
Swiss dramatists and playwrights
Academic staff of the University of Music and Theatre Leipzig
University of Zurich alumni
Swiss women dramatists and playwrights